Presidential elections were held in Ecuador in 1916. The result was a victory for Alfredo Baquerizo, who received 94% of the vote.

Results

References

Presidential elections in Ecuador
Ecuador
1916 in Ecuador
Election and referendum articles with incomplete results